Niantjila is a small town and commune in the Cercle of Dioila in the Koulikoro Region of southern Mali.

Demographics 
As of 1998 the commune had a population of 12,845.

References

External links

Communes of Koulikoro Region